The 2013 Virginia Tech Hokies baseball team is representing Virginia Tech in the 2013 NCAA Division I baseball season.  They will play in the 2013 ACC Championship. Head Coach Pete Hughes is in his 7th year coaching the Hokies. They are coming off a 2012 season, in which they had a 34 win season.  11 of them came in the ACC.  That marked the fourth straight year with over 30 wins under Pete Hughes.

Personnel

Schedule 

! style="background:#ff6600;color:#660000;"| Regular Season
|- valign="top" 

|- bgcolor="#ccffcc"
| February 15 ||  || – || Brooks Field || 10–9 || J. Joyce (W, 1-0)||J. Pierce (0-1)||C. Labitan(1)|| 351 || 1–0 || –
|- bgcolor="#ccffcc"
| February 16 || Kent State || – || Brooks Field || 8-1 ||B. Markey (1-0))||C. Wilson (0-1)||None|| 519 || 2-0 || –
|- bgcolor="#ccffcc"
| February 16 ||  || – || Brooks Field || 9-0 || D. Burke (1-0)||J. Ramsey (0-1)|| None || 1,038 || 3-0 || –
|- bgcolor="#ccffcc"
| February 17 || UNC Wilmington || – || Brooks Field || 7-2 || T. McIntyre (1-0)||T. Blaze (0-1)||J. Joyce (1)|| 1,002 || 4-0 || –
|- align="center" bgcolor="#ffbbb"
| February 23 ||  || 24 || English Field|| 3–7 ||E. Peterson (1-0)||J. Joyce (1-1)||None|| 251 || 4-1 || –
|- bgcolor="#ccffcc"
| February 23 ||  || 24 || English Field || 7–5 ||B. Hayden (1-0)||T. Mara (0-1)|| C. Labitan(2)|| 1,063 || 5–1 || –
|- bgcolor="#ccffcc"
| February 24 ||  || 24 || English Field || 13–4 ||B. Markey (2-0)|| A. Davis (0-2)||None|| 279 || 6–1 || –
|- bgcolor="#ccffcc"
| February 25 ||  Delaware || 24 || English Field || 5–3 ||D. Burke (2-0)|| E. Buckland (1-1)||C. Labitan(3)|| 236 || 7–1 || –
|- bgcolor="#ccffcc"
| February 27 ||  || 25 || English Field || 14-10 || S. Keselica (1-0)||D. Nelson (1-1)||None|| 361|| 8–1 || –
|-

|- bgcolor="#ccffcc"
| March 1 || Rhode Island || 25 || USA Complex Field  || 7–3 ||J. Joyce (2-1)||S. Furney (0-1)||None|| 227 || 9–1 || –
|- bgcolor="#ccffcc"
| March 1 ||  || 25 || Coleman Field || 8–2 || E. Campbell (1-0)||J. Miller (1-2)||None|| 193 || 10–1 || –
|- align="center" bgcolor="#ffbbb"
| March 2 || #22  || 25 || Coleman Field|| 0-3 ||A. Norton (3-0)||B. Markey (2-1)||None|| 477 || 10–2 || –
|- bgcolor="#ccffcc"
| March 3 ||  || 25 || Coleman Field ||7–3 ||D. Burke (3-0) ||A. Quillen (0-1)||J. Joyce(2)||376|| 11–2 || –
|- bgcolor="#CCCCCC"
| March 6 || || – || English Field || colspan=7|Cancelled due to weather
|- align="center" bgcolor="#ffbbb"
| March 8 || #14 * || 24 || English Field || 1-11 || B. Farmer (3-0) || E. Campbell (1-1) || None ||312|| 11-3 || 0-1
|- align="center" bgcolor="#ffbbb"
| March 9 || #14 Georgia Tech* || 24 || English Field || 9-14 ||A. Cruz (2-0)||C. Labitan (0-1)|| None || 1,217 || 11-4 || 0-2
|- bgcolor="#ccffcc"
| March 10 || #14 Georgia Tech* || 24 || English Field || 6-2 ||D. Burke (4-0)|| C. Pitts (3-1)|| None || 1,142 || 12-4 || 1-2
|- bgcolor="#ccffcc"
| March 12 || at  || – || The Hayes || 6-1 ||T. McIntyre (2-0) ||J. Harris (0-1) || None || 1,203 || 13-4 || 1-2
|- align="center" bgcolor="#ffbbb"
| March 13 || at  || – ||Latham Park || 3-4 || B. Kacer (1-0) || E. Campbell (1-2)|| N. Young(4) ||201 || 13-5 || 1-2
|- bgcolor="#ccffcc"
| March 15 || at * || – || Coombs Field || 2-1 || J. Joyce (3-1) || A. Istler (1-2) || None || 157 || 14-5 || 2-2
|- bgcolor="#ccffcc"
| March 16 || at Duke* || – || Coombs Field|| 14-7 || D. Burke (5-0) || D. Van Orden (1-2) || None || 232 || 15-5 || 3-2
|- bgcolor="#ccffcc"
| March 17 || at Duke* || – || Coombs Field || 6–2 || J. Mantiply (1-0) || R. Huber (2-2) || None || 253 || 16-5 || 4–2
|- bgcolor="#ccffcc"
| March 19 ||  || – || English Field || 16-6 || S.  Keselica (2-0) || B. Fulghum (1-1) || None || 129 || 17-5 || 4-2
|- align="center" bgcolor="#ffbbb"
| March 22 || at * || – || Mark Light Field || 9-11 || C. Diaz (3-1) || B. Markey (2-2) || None || 2,428 || 17-6 || 4-3
|- align="center" bgcolor="#ffbbb"
| March 23 || at Miami (FL)* || – || Mark Light Field || 0–2 || B. Radziwski (3-0) || D. Burke (5-1) || None || 2,528 || 17-7 || 4-4
|- bgcolor="#ccffcc"
| March 24 || at Miami (FL)* || – || Mark Light Field || 8–5 || T. McIntyre (3-0) || A. Salcines (2-3) || None || 2,576 || 18–7 || 5–4
|- align="center" bgcolor="#ffbbb"
| March 26 ||  || – || English Field || 0–8 || T. Lighton (3-2) || C. O'Keefe (0-1) || None || 158 || 18–8 || 5–4
|- bgcolor="#ccffcc"
| March 29 || #4 * || – || English Field || 3-2 || B. Markey (3-2) || B. Leibrandt (4-2) || None || 1,141 || 19-8 || 6-4
|- align="center" bgcolor="#ffbbb"
| March 30 || #4 Florida State* || – || English Field || 10–11 || B. Holtmann (2-0) || E. Campbell (1-3) || R. Coles(6) || 3,389 || 19-9 || 6-5
|- align="center" bgcolor="#cffcc"
| March 30 || #4 Florida State* || – || English Field || 8-1 || J. Mantiply (2-0) || P. Miller (3-1) || C. Labitan(5) || 682 || 20-9 || 7-5
|-

|- bgcolor="#ccffcc"
|April 2 || VCU || - || English Field || 11-5 || J. Joyce (4-1) || D. Black (0-1) || None || 1,042 || 21-9 || 7-5
|- align="center" bgcolor="#ffbbb"
|April 5 || at #27 NC State* || - || Doak Field || 7-8 || J. Easley (3-2) || S. Keselica (2-1) || None || 2,073 || 21-10 || 7-6
|- align="center" bgcolor="#ffbbb"
|April 6 || at #27 NC State* || - || Doak Field || 4-13 || A. Tzamtzis (2-1) || D. Burke (5-3) || None || 2,854 || 21-11 || 7-7
|- align="center" bgcolor="#ffbbb"
|April 7|| at #27 NC State* || - || Doak Field || 3-7 || R. Wilkins (5-1) || C. Labitan (0-3) || None || 2,279 || 21-12 || 7-8
|- bgcolor="#ccffcc"
|April 9 ||  || - || English Field || 7-5 || J. Joyce (5-1) || T. Burnette (3-4) || None || 1,023 || 22-12 || 7-8
|- align="center" bgcolor="#ffbbb"
| April 12 || #2 North Carolina* || - || English Field || 8-21 || K. Emmanuel (7-1) || B. Markey (3-3) || None || 2,981 || 22-13 || 7-9
|- align="center" bgcolor="#ffbbb"
| April 13 || #2 North Carolina* || - || English Field || 8-9 || T. Thornton (7-0) || C. Labitan (0-3) || None || 2,811 || 22-14 || 7-10
|- align="center" bgcolor="#ffbbb"
| April 14 || #2 North Carolina* || - || English Field || 0-3 || H. Johnson (1-0) || D. Burke (5-3) || T. Parrish(2) || 2,723 || 22-15 || 7-11
|- align="center" bgcolor="#ffbbb"
| April 16 ||  || - || English Field || 4-5 || Thomas (2-0) || C. O'Keefe (0-2) || Cox(1) || 2,518 || 22-16 || 7-11
|- align="center" bgcolor="#ffbbb"
| April 19 || at * || - || Shipley Field || 9-10 || K. Mooney (3-1) || C. Labitan (0-4) || None || 550 || 22-17 || 7-12
|- bgcolor="#ccffcc"
| April 20 || at Maryland* || - || Shipley Field || 11-0 || J. Mantiply (3-0) || B. Kirkpatrick (3-6) || None || 534 || 23-17 || 8-12
|- bgcolor="#ccffcc"
| April 21 || at Maryland* || - || Shipley Field || 3-2 || D. Burke (6-3) || J. Stinnette (4-4) || None || 562 || 24-17 || 9-12
|- bgcolor="#ccffcc"
| April 23 || at  || - || Gray–Minor Stadium || 9-6 || J. Joyce (6-1) || C. Henkel (1-5) || B. Hayden(1) || 488 || 25-17 || 9-12
|- align="center" bgcolor="#ffbbb"
| April 26 || #5 Virginia* || - || English Field || 6-15 || B. Waddell (4-1) || B. Markey (3-4) || None || 3,142 || 25-18 || 9-13
|- bgcolor="#ccffcc"
| April 27 || #5 Virginia* || - || English Field || 5-3 || J. Mantiply (4-0) || S. Silverstein (7-1) || C. Labitan(6) || 2,681 || 26-18 || 10-13
|- bgcolor="#ccffcc"
| April 27 || #5 Virginia* || - || English Field || 11-6 || D. Burke (7-3) || N. Howard (5-4) || None || 1,161 || 27-18 || 11-13
|- bgcolor="#ccffcc"
| April 30 || at  || - || Radford Baseball Stadium || 4-3 || B. Hayden (2-0) || D. Nelson (5-3) || C. Labitan(7) || 542 || 28-18 || 11-13
|-

|- bgcolor="#ccffcc"
| May 3 || at * || - || Shea Field || 1-0 || B. Markey (4-4) || N. Poore (1-3) || None || 627 || 29-18 || 12-13
|- bgcolor="#ccffcc"
| May 4 || at Boston College* || - || Shea Field || 7-5 || D. Burke (8-3) || E. Stevens (0-11) || J. Joyce(3) || 2,306 || 30-18 || 13-13
|- align="center" bgcolor="#ffbbb"
| May 5 || at Boston College* || - || Shea Field || 3-5 || J. Burke (1-1) || C. Labitan (0-5) || J. Gorman(2) || 843 || 30-19 || 13-14
|- bgcolor="#ccffcc"
| May 8 ||  || - || English Field || 11-4 || B. Hayden (3-0) || R, Retz (4-4) || None || 341 || 31-19 || 13-14
|- bgcolor="#ccffcc"
| May 11 ||  || - || English Field || 7-6 || D. Burke (9-3) || K. McCarthy (4-3) || C. Labitan(8) || 584 || 32-19 || 13-14
|- bgcolor="#ccffcc"
| May 12 || Marist || - || English Field || 7-6 || C. Labitan (1-5) || J. Eich (1-2) || None || 1,076 || 33-19 || 13-14
|- bgcolor="#ccffcc"
| May 16 || * || - || English Field || 13-2 || J. Mantiply (5-0) || J. Fischer (2-4) || None || 962 || 34-19 || 14-14
|- bgcolor="#ccffcc"
| May 17 || Wake Forest* || - || English Field || 5-3 || J. Joyce (7-1) || N. Spezial (6-1) || C. Labitan(9) || 1,420 || 35-19 || 15-14
|- bgcolor="#CCCCCC"
| May 18 || Wake Forest* || - || English Field || colspan=7|Cancelled due to weather
|-

|-
! style="background:#ff6600;color:#660000;"| Post-Season
|- 

|- bgcolor="#ccffcc"
| May 22 || #6 Virginia (3) || – || Durham Bulls Athletic Park || 10-1 || J. Mantiply (6-0) || B. Waddell (5-2) || None || 2,455 || 1-0
|- bgcolor="#ccffcc"
| May 23 || #7 Florida State (2) || – || Durham Bulls Athletic Park || 3-2 || C. Labitan (2-5) || G. Smith (4-1) || None || 3,020 || 2-0
|- bgcolor="#ccffcc"
| May 24 || Georgia Tech (7) || – || Durham Bulls Athletic Park || 3-2 || D. Burke (10-3) || J. King (6-5) || C. Labitan(10) || 3,129 || 3-0
|- align="center" bgcolor="#ffbbb"
| May 26 || #5 North Carolina (1) || – || Durham Bulls Athletic Park || 1-4 || T. Cherry (1-0) || E. Campbell (2-4) || T. Kelley (2) || 8,697 || 3-1
|-

|- align="center" bgcolor="ffbbb"
| May 31 || Connecticut (4) || #22 || English Field || 2-5 || C. Cross (9–4) || J. Mantiply (6–1) || P. Butler (5) || 3,566 || 0–1
|- bgcolor="#ccffcc"
| June 1 ||  (3) || #22 || English Field || 9-1 || D. Burke (11-3) || B. Smith 5-4 || None || 1,772 || 1-1
|- bgcolor="#ccffcc"
| June 2 || Connecticut (4) || #22 || English Field || 3-1 || B. Markey (5-4) || A. Marzi 5-7 || Labitan (11) || 1,203 || 2-1
|-

|-
| style="font-size:88%" | Rankings from USA TODAY/ESPN Top 25 coaches' baseball poll. Parenthesis indicate tournament seedings.
|-
| style="font-size:88%" | *ACC Conference games

Awards and honors

See also 
 Virginia Tech Hokies
 2013 NCAA Division I baseball season

References 

Virginia Tech Hokies
Virginia Tech Hokies baseball seasons
2013 NCAA Division I baseball tournament participants
Virginia Tech